The Light in Your Eyes is a 2019 South Korean television series starring Han Ji-min, Kim Hye-ja, Nam Joo-hyuk, and Son Ho-jun. It aired on JTBC's Mondays and Tuesdays during the 21:30 (KST) time slot from February 11 to March 19, 2019. The drama was critically acclaimed for intimately portraying the hardships everyday people face. It is also one of the highest-rated Korean dramas in cable television history.

Synopsis
To prevent her father from dying in a car accident, Kim Hye Ja manipulates time with a special watch she found at a beach as a child. However, manipulating time comes with a heavy price- Hye Ja will age each time she turns back time. Meanwhile, a young man named Lee Joon Ha who has a beautiful friendship with Hye Ja, is exhausted from his family problems and has given up on all his dreams. He now works as a scammer at an elderly care center unaware that Hye Ja has become an old lady and goes there to pass time after turning old for manipulating time. The two cross each other’s paths again, but this time both have changed.

Cast

Main
 Kim Hye-ja as Kim Hye-ja (70 years old)
 Han Ji-min as Kim Hye-ja (26 years old)
 Nam Joo-hyuk as Lee Joon-ha (26 years old)
 Nam Joo-hyuk as Kim Sang-hyeon
A Doctor in Hyoja Nursing Hospital, also resembles Kim Hye-ja's late husband, Lee Joon-ha.
 Son Ho-jun as Kim Young-soo (Lee Min-soo)

Supporting

People around Hye-ja
 Ahn Nae-sang as Lee Dae-sang
 Seo Woo-jin as young Lee Dae-sang
 Lee Jung-eun as Moon Jung-eun
 Kim Ga-eun as Lee Hyun-joo
 Song Sang-eun as Yoon Sang-eun

People around Joon-ha
 Kim Young-ok as Joon-ha's grandmother

Others
 Kim Hee-won as Kim Hee-won
 Park Soo-young as Kim Byun-sub	
 Jung Young-sook as Chanel (Choi Hwa-young)
 Kim Kwang-sik as Byung-soo
 Woo Hyun as Woo Hyun
 Shim Hee-sub as Doctor (ep.3)

Special appearances
 Kim Kiri as Park Kwang-soo (Ep. 1)
 Hyun Woo as Kwon Jang-ho (Ep. 1)
 Kim Byung-man as a performer (Ep. 5)
 Choi Moo-sung as an egg seller (Ep. 5)
 Im Chang-jung as a swindler (Ep. 5)
 Hwang Jung-min as a shaman (Ep. 11)
 Yoon Bok-hee as Yoon Bok-hee (Ep. 11)

Production
The first script reading took place on September 26, 2018 at JTBC Building in Sangam-dong, Seoul, South Korea.

Original soundtrack

Part 1

Part 2

Part 3

Part 4

Part 5

Part 6

Ratings

Awards and nominations

References

External links
  
 
 

Korean-language television shows
JTBC television dramas
2019 South Korean television series debuts
2019 South Korean television series endings
South Korean fantasy television series
Television series by Drama House